Dorota Kędzierzawska (born 1 June 1957) is a Polish director of feature and documentary films.

Kędzierzawska was born in Łódź. She graduated from the National Film School in Łódź in 1981 but prior to that had completed a course in cultural studies at the University of Łódź and studied film directing in Moscow for two years.

Kędzierzawska is the director of several acclaimed films, such as Crows, Nothing, I Am, and Devils, Devils. In her films she concentrates on the experiences of disadvantaged children who contend with a difficult financial situation, rejection by adults, or both. Her characters are usually women, hopelessly fighting for the love of their men. Her most recent film, Time to Die (Pora Umierać, 2007), is a powerful black-and-white depiction of the daily life of an old woman named Aniela, played by Polish screen and stage legend Danuta Szaflarska.

Dorota Kędzierzawska directed the following movies:
 Another World (2012)
 Tomorrow Will Be Better (2011)
 Time to Die (2007)
 I Am (2005)
 Nic (1998)
 Wrony (1994, aka Crows)
 Diabły, diabły (1991, screened for the 30th International Critics' Week of Cannes)
 Koniec Świata (1998, TV Movie) 
 Gucia (1985, Short film)
 Początek (1983, Short documentary)
 Jajko (1982, Short film)
 Agnieszka'' (1980, Short film)

References

External links
 Dorota Kędzierzawska at the Filmpolski.pl 

1957 births
Polish women film directors
Living people
Film people from Łódź
Łódź Film School alumni
Polish film directors
Polish women screenwriters